Sorina Ștefîrță (born 10 December 1973) is a journalist from the Republic of Moldova. She is the editor-in-chief of Timpul de dimineață, a major Moldovan newspaper.

References

External links 
 Alumni news

Moldova State University alumni
Moldovan journalists
Romanian people of Moldovan descent
Living people
Moldovan women journalists
1973 births